Mohammed VI (born 21 August 1963) is the King of Morocco. He belongs to the 'Alawi dynasty and acceded to the throne on 23 July 1999, upon the death of his father, King Hassan II.

Mohammed has vast business holdings across several economic sectors in Morocco. In 2015, Forbes named him the richest king in Africa and the fifth wealthiest monarch in the world.

In 2023, Mohammed was named by the Royal Islamic Strategic Studies Centre as the seventh most influential Muslim in the world.

Upon ascending to the throne, Mohammed initially introduced a number of reforms and changed the family code, Mudawana, granting women more power. Leaked diplomatic cables from WikiLeaks in 2010 led to allegations of corruption in the court of Mohammed, implicating him and his closest advisors. In 2011, protests considered part of the wider Arab Spring occurred against alleged government corruption. In response, Mohammed enacted several reforms and introduced a new constitution. These reforms were passed by a public referendum on 1 July 2011.

Early life and education 

Mohammed VI was born on 21 August 1963 and was the second child and oldest son of Hassan II and his wife, Lalla Latifa. As their oldest son, Mohammed became heir apparent and Crown Prince from birth. His father was keen on giving him a religious and political education from an early age; at the age of four, he started attending the Quranic school at the Royal Palace.

Mohammed VI completed his first primary and secondary studies at Collège Royal and attained his Baccalaureate in 1981, before gaining a bachelor's degree in law at the Mohammed V University at Agdal in 1985. His research paper dealt with "the Arab-African Union and the Strategy of the Kingdom of Morocco in matters of International Relations". He has also frequented the Imperial College and University of Rabat. He was furthermore appointed president of the Pan Arab Games, and was commissioned a Colonel Major of the Royal Moroccan Army on 26 November 1985. He served as the Coordinator of the Offices and Services of the Royal Armed Forces until 1994.

In 1987, Mohammed VI obtained his first Certificat d'Études Supérieures (CES) in political sciences, and in July 1988 he obtained a Diplôme d'Études Approfondies (DEA) in public law. In November 1988, he trained in Brussels with Jacques Delors, then-President of the European Commission.

Mohammed VI obtained his PhD in law with distinction on 29 October 1993 from the French University of Nice Sophia Antipolis for his thesis on "EEC-Maghreb Relations". On 12 July 1994, he was promoted to the military rank of Major General, and that same year he became president of the High Council of Culture and Commander-in-Chief of the Royal Moroccan Army.

King of Morocco 

On 23 July 1999, following the death of his father, Mohammed VI ascended to the throne as king and was crowned in Rabat on 30 July.

Social reforms and liberalization 

Shortly after his ascension, King Mohammed VI made a national televised address, promising to take on poverty and corruption, while creating jobs and improving Morocco's human rights record. His reformist rhetoric was opposed by Islamist conservatives, and some of his reforms angered fundamentalists. In February 2004, he enacted a new family code, or Mudawana, which granted women more power.

Mohammed VI also created the Equity and Reconciliation Commission (IER), which was tasked with researching human rights violations under Hassan II. This move was welcomed by many as promoting democracy, but was also criticized because the commission's reports could not name the perpetrators. According to human rights organisations, human rights violations are still common in Morocco.

In January 2017, Morocco banned the manufacturing, marketing and sale of the burqa.

2011 protests and constitutional reform 

The 2011 Moroccan protests, led by the 20 February Movement, were primarily motivated by corruption and general political discontentment, as well as by the hardships of the global economic crisis. The demonstrations were influenced by then-recent revolutions in Tunisia and Egypt which overthrew their respective leaders, and demands by protesters included "urgent" political and social reforms, including the relinquishment of some of the King's powers.

In a speech delivered on 9 March 2011, Mohammed VI said that parliament would receive "new powers that enable it to discharge its representative, legislative, and regulatory mission". In addition, the powers of the judiciary were granted greater independence from the king, who announced that he was impaneling a committee of legal scholars to produce a draft constitution by June 2011. On 1 July, voters approved a set of political reforms proposed by Mohammed VI in a referendum.

The reforms consisted of the following:
 The Berber language is an official national language, along with standard Arabic.
 The state preserves and protects the Hassānīya language and all the linguistic components of the Moroccan culture as a heritage of the nation.
 The king now has the obligation to appoint the prime minister from the party that wins the most seats in the parliamentary elections, but it can be any member of the winning party and not necessarily the party's leader. Previously, the king could nominate anybody he wanted for this position regardless of the election results. That was usually the case when no party had a big advantage over the other parties, in terms of the number of seats in the parliament.
 The king is no longer "sacred or holy" but the "integrity of his person" is "inviolable".
 High administrative and diplomatic posts (including ambassadors, CEOs of state-owned companies, provincial and regional governors), are now appointed by the prime minister and the ministerial council which is presided by the king; previously the latter exclusively held this power.
 The prime minister is the head of government and president of the council of government, he has the power to dissolve the parliament.
 The prime minister will preside over the Council of Government, which prepares the general policy of the state. Previously the king held this position.
 The parliament has the power of granting amnesty. Previously this was exclusively held by the king.
 The judiciary system is independent from the legislative and executive branches, the king guarantees this independence.
 Women are guaranteed "civic and social" equality with men. Previously, only "political equality" was guaranteed, though the 1996 constitution grants all citizens equality in terms of rights before the law.
 The king retains complete control over the armed forces and the judiciary as well as matters pertaining to religion and foreign policy; the king also retains the authority to appoint and dismiss prime ministers.
 In theory, all citizens the freedom of thought, ideas, artistic expression and creation. Previously only free speech and the freedom of circulation and association were guaranteed. However, criticizing or directly opposing the king is still punishable with prison.

Western Sahara 
The Western Sahara conflict is considered one of the longest-running on the African continent. Mohammed VI has repeatedly stressed that the "Moroccanness of the Sahara" remains an "indisputable fact", a stance adopted by Morocco following the 1975 Green March during the reign of Hassan II. He visited Western Sahara in 2006 and 2015, and has asserted that Morocco was not negotiating over the territory, as the issue "never was - and never will be - on the negotiating table".

In March 2006, Mohammed VI created the Royal Advisory Council for Saharan Affairs (CORCAS), an advisory committee which defends Morocco's claim over Western Sahara. In 2021, the CORCAS condemned the Sahrawi refugee camps in Tindouf, citing human rights concerns.

Morocco's stance on the Western Sahara is that it is an integral part of its territory and it has proposed a plan for its autonomy, provided it remains under Moroccan sovereignty. The Polisario Front, the main opposite party to the conflict, insists on ultimately pursuing for the establishment of an independent Sahrawi Arab Democratic Republic. Morocco and the Polisario Front reached a ceasefire agreement in 1991, which included the establishment of a United Nations peacekeeping mission (MINURSO) to oversee and conduct a potential referendum on the future status of Western Sahara; to this day, such a referendum has never occurred.

Since 2019, several primarily African and Arab countries have established consulates in Laayoune and Dakhla. In 2020, an escalation of the conflict began when Sahrawi protesters blocked a road connecting Guerguerat to sub-Saharan Africa via Mauritania. Morocco responded by intervening militarily to resume movement of people and goods through Guerguerat, which the Polisario Front claimed had violated the 1991 ceasefire agreement.

Foreign policy 

Mohammed VI increasingly prioritized African relations in Morocco's foreign policy. Morocco had previously withdrawn from the Organisation of African Unity, precursor to the current African Union (AU), in 1984 after the Polisario's Sahrawi Arab Democratic Republic was admitted to the organisation. In July 2016, Mohammed VI sent a message to the 27th African Union summit being held in Kigali, in which he requested Moroccan readmission to the AU, and justified his country's withdrawal saying that "the admission of a non-sovereign entity, by means of transgression and collusion" had prompted Morocco to "seek to avoid the division of Africa". Morocco would later be admitted to the African Union in January 2017.

Under his reign, Morocco endorsed partnerships with the Gulf Cooperation Council as well as other non-traditional great powers, mainly China and Russia, aiming to diversify trade links and foreign investments and to limit Morocco's traditional reliance on the West, particularly the European Union (EU). Morocco has also offered to act as a mediator in the Libyan crisis, and remained neutral in the Qatar diplomatic crisis.

The Bush administration designated Morocco as a major non-NATO ally of the United States in 2004. Mohammed VI had previously visited the White House in June 2000, alongside his sister, Princess Lalla Meryem, and attended a state dinner with President Bill Clinton. Washington and Rabat later signed a free-trade agreement in 2006, the only one of its kind between the U.S. and an African country, which was met with some criticism within Morocco due to increasing trade deficit.

Morocco and Israel restored diplomatic relations on 10 December 2020, as part of the Israel–Morocco normalization agreement involving the United States, which at the same time recognized Morocco's sovereignty over Western Sahara. In June 2021, Mohammed congratulated Naftali Bennett on his election as Israeli prime minister. On the International Day of Solidarity with the Palestinian People in November 2021, Mohammed announced that Morocco would continue to push for a restart of Israeli-Palestinian peace negotiations. He called on both sides "to refrain from actions that obstruct the peace process".

Despite calls by Mohammed VI for reconciliation, relations with neighbouring Algeria continued to intensify over the course of his rule. In July 2004, Mohammed announced that Morocco would lift visa restrictions for Algerians, with Algerian President Abdelaziz Bouteflika reciprocating the measure in 2005. Tensions gradually escalated in the 2020s, primarily as a result of the Israel–Morocco normalization agreement and Guerguerat border clashes. In August 2021, Algeria accused Morocco of supporting the Movement for the self-determination of Kabylie, which it blamed for wildfires in northern Algeria, and later severed diplomatic relations with Morocco.

In August 2022, during a speech marking the anniversary of the Revolution of the King and the People, Mohammed VI said that the Western Sahara issue "is the lens through which Morocco looks at the world", and through which it "measures the sincerity of friendships and the efficiency of partnerships", while calling on other countries "to clarify their positions [regarding the Western Sahara] and reconsider them in a manner that leaves no room for doubt".

Other causes 
On 20 December 2022, Mohammed VI, accompanied by Crown Prince Moulay Hassan and Prince Moulay Rachid, received the members of the national football team at the Royal Palace in Rabat, after their reaching fourth place at the 2022 FIFA World Cup, and awarded the team with the Order of the Throne.

On 15 February 2023, Mohammed VI donated 2,000 tonnes of fertilizer to Gabon, handed over during a meeting at the Presidential Palace in Libreville with President Ali Bongo Ondimba.

On 7 March 2023, Mohammed VI was invited by CAF president Patrice Motsepe to receive the CAF's outstanding achievement award. During the awards ceremony in Kigali, Chakib Benmoussa, attending on behalf of the king, announced in a letter written by Mohammed that Morocco would join the Spain–Portugal 2030 FIFA World Cup bid as a co-host.

Business and wealth 

Mohammed is Morocco's leading businessman and banker. In 2015, he was estimated by Forbes magazine to be worth US$5.7bn although in 2019 Business Insider quoted a figure of just US$2.1 billion. The Moroccan Royal Family, meanwhile, has one of the largest fortunes in the world. Together, they hold the majority stakes in the Al Mada holding, formerly named the Société Nationale d'Investissement (SNI), which was originally state-owned but was merged in 2013 with Omnium Nord Africain (ONA Group), to form a single holding company that was taken off the Casablanca Stock Exchange—resulting in the scrapping of an equivalent of 50 billion Dirhams Marketcap (~US$6 billion). Al Mada has a diverse portfolio consisting of many important businesses in Morocco, operating in various sectors including: Attijariwafa Bank (banking), Managem (mining), Onapar, SOMED (tourism/real-estate and exclusive distributor of Maserati), Wafa Assurance (insurance), Marjane (hypermarket chain), Wana-Inwi (telecommunications), SONASID (Siderurgy), Lafarge Maroc, Sopriam (exclusive distributor of Peugeot-Citroën in Morocco), Renault Maroc (exclusive distributor of Renault in Morocco) and Nareva (energy). It also owns many food-processing companies and is currently in the process of disengaging from this sector. Between mid-2012 and 2013, the holding sold Lessieur, Centrale Laitière, Bimo and Cosumar to foreign groups for a total amount of ~$1.37 billion (11.4 billion Dirhams including 9.7 billion in 2013 and 1.7 in 2012).

SNI and ONA both owned stakes in Brasseries du Maroc, the largest alcoholic beverages manufacturer and distributor of brands such as Heineken in the country. In March 2018, the SNI adopted its current name, Al Mada.

Mohammed is also a leading agricultural producer and land owner in Morocco, where agriculture is exempted from taxes. His personal holding company SIGER has shares in the large agricultural group "Les domaines agricoles" (originally called "Les domaines royaux", now commonly known as "Les domaines"), which was founded by Hassan II. In 2008, Telquel estimated that "Les domaines" had a revenue of $157 million (1.5 billion Dirhams), with 170,000 tons of citrus exported in that year. According to the same magazine, the company officially owns 12,000 hectares of agricultural lands. "Chergui", a manufacturer of dairy products, is the most recognizable brand of the group. Between 1994 and 2004, the group has been managed by Mohammed VI's brother-in-law Khalid Benharbit, the husband of Princess Lalla Hasna. "Les domaines" also owns the "Royal Golf de Marrakech", which originally belonged to Thami El Glaoui.

His palace's daily operating budget is reported by Forbes to be $960,000—which is paid by the Moroccan state as part of a 2.576 billion Dirhams/year budget as of 2014—with much of it accounted for by the expense of personnel, clothes, and car repairs.

Controversies

Royal pardon scandals 

Protests broke out in Rabat, the capital of Morocco, on 2 August 2013, after Mohammed pardoned 48 jailed Spaniards, including a pedophile who had been serving a 30-year sentence for raping 11 children aged between 4 and 15.

It was also revealed that amongst the pardoned was a drug trafficking suspect, who was released before standing trial. The detainee, Antonio Garcia, a recidivist drug trafficker, had been arrested in possession of 9 tons of hashish in Tangier and was sentenced to 10 years. He had resisted arrest using a firearm. Some media claimed that his release embarrassed Spain.

Allegations of corruption 
Royal involvement in business is a major topic in Morocco, but public discussion of it is sensitive. The US embassy in Rabat reported to Washington in a leaked cable that "corruption is prevalent at all levels of Moroccan society". Corruption allegedly reaches the highest levels in Morocco, where the business interests of Mohammed VI and some of his advisors influence "every large housing project," according to WikiLeaks documents published in December 2010 and quoted in The Guardian newspaper. The documents released by the whistleblower website also quote the case of a businessman working for a US consortium, whose plans in Morocco were paralysed for months after he refused to join forces with a company linked with the royal palace. The documents quoted a company executive linked to the royal family as saying at a meeting that decisions on big investments in the kingdom were taken by only three people: the king, his secretary Mounir Majidi, and the monarch's close friend, adviser and former classmate Fouad Ali El Himma. This corruption especially affects the housing sector, the WikiLeaks documents show.

In April 2016, Mounir Majidi, the personal secretary of Mohammed VI, was named in the Panama Papers.

Family and personal life 
Mohammed has one brother, Prince Moulay Rachid, and three sisters: Princess Lalla Meryem, Princess Lalla Asma, and Princess Lalla Hasna. The New York Times noted "conflicting reports about whether the new monarch had been married on Friday night, within hours of his father's death [in 1999]... to heed a Moroccan tradition that a King be married before he ascends the throne." A palace official subsequently denied that a marriage had taken place.

His engagement to Salma Bennani was officially announced on 12 October 2001. They married in private in Rabat on 21 March 2002 and their wedding was officially celebrated at the Dar al-Makhzen in Rabat on 12 and 13 July 2002. Bennani was granted the personal title of Princess with the title of Her Royal Highness on her marriage. They have two children: Crown Prince Moulay Hassan, who was born on 8 May 2003, and Princess Lalla Khadija, who was born on 28 February 2007.

Mohammed's birthday on 21 August is a public holiday, although festivities were cancelled upon the death of his aunt in 2014.

In 2020, Mohammed reportedly purchased an €80 million mansion in Paris from the Saudi royal family.

Children

Health 
King Mohammed VI's health has been a reoccurring topic both within and outside Morocco.

In 2017, he underwent a successful surgery at the Quinze-Vingts National Ophthalmology Hospital in Paris to remove a pterygium in his left eye. In February 2018, he underwent a radiofrequency ablation to normalize an irregular heart rate, and was visited by members of the royal family. In September 2019, the King was advised to rest for several days to recover from acute viral pneumonia, while his son Crown Prince Moulay Hassan represented him at former French President Jacques Chirac's funeral. In June 2020, he underwent a procedure in Rabat to treat a recurrence of atrial flutter.

In June 2022, Mohammed VI tested positive for COVID-19. His personal doctor said he did not exhibit symptoms and recommended "a period of rest for a few days". Jeune Afrique reported that he contracted the disease while on a private visit to France. On 10 July 2022, he made his first public appearance since recovering from COVID-19 and performed Eid al-Adha rituals and prayers.

Honours

National orders
  Grand Master of the Order of Muhammad, (23 July 1999)
  Grand Master of the Order of the Throne (23 July 1999)
  Grand Master of the Order of Ouissam Alaouite (23 July 1999)
  Grand Master of the Order of the Independence Combat (23 July 1999)
  Grand Master of the Order of Fidelity (23 July 1999)
  Grand Master of the Order of Military Merit (23 July 1999)

Mohammed has received numerous honours and decorations from various countries, some of which are listed below.

Foreign orders
  Grand Officer of the Order of the Equatorial Star of Gabon (7 July 1977)
  Collar of the Order of Civil Merit of Spain (2 June 1979)
  Honorary Knight of the Grand Cross of the Royal Victorian Order of Great Britain and Northern Ireland (27 October 1980)
  Grand Cross of the Order of Charles III of Spain (23 June 1986)
  Grand Cordon of the Order of the Republic of Tunisia (August 1987)
  Grand Cross of the Order of Merit of the Italian Republic of Italy (18 March 1997)
  Grand Cross of the Order of Aviz of Portugal (13 August 1998)
  Grand Cross of the Legion of Honour of France (19 March 2000)
  Collar of the Order of al-Hussein bin Ali of Jordan (1 March 2000)
  Collar of the Order of Merit of the Italian Republic of Italy (11 April 2000)
  Grand Cordon of the National Order of Merit of Mauritania (26 April 2000)
  Grand Cross of the Order of the Seventh of November of Tunisia (24 May 2000)
  Grand Cordon of the National Order of Mali of Mali with Collar (14 June 2000)
  Collar of the Order of Isabella the Catholic of Spain (16 September 2000)
  Wissam of the Order of the Umayyads of Syria (9 April 2001)
  Extraordinary Grade	of the Order of Merit of Lebanon (13 June 2001)
  First Class Medal of the Order of Abu Bakar Siddiq of the International Red Cross and Red Crescent Movement (29 June 2001)
  Grand Collar of the Order of al-Khalifa of Bahrain (28 July 2001)
  Silver Star of United States (21 January 2002)
  Collar of the Order of Mubarak the Great of Kuwait (22 October 2002)
  Cordon of the Order of the Independence of Qatar (25 October 2002)
  Grand Cordon of the Order of the Nile of Egypt (28 October 2002)
  Grand Cross of the Order of Pakistan First Class (Nishan-e-Pakistan) of Pakistan (19 July 2003)
  Grand Cross of the Order of Valour of Cameroon (17 June 2004)
  Grand Cross of the Order of the Equatorial Star of Gabon (21 June 2004)
  Grand Cross of the National Order of the Niger of the Niger (24 June 2004)
  Grand Cordon of the Order of Leopold of Belgium (5 October 2004)
  Collar of the Order of the Southern Cross of Brazil (26 November 2004)
  Medal of Honour of the Congress of Peru (1 December 2004)
  Collar of the Order of Bernardo O'Higgins of Chile (3 December 2004)
  Grand Collar of the Order of the Liberator General San Martin of Argentina (7 December 2004)
  Collar of the Order of Charles III of Spain (14 January 2005)
  Grand Collar of the Order of the Aztec Eagle of Mexico (11 February 2005)
  Grand Cross of the Order of Burkinabé of Burkina Faso (1 March 2005)
  Supreme Collar of the Order of the Chrysanthemum of Japan (28 November 2005)
  Grand Commander of the Order of the Republic of the Gambia (20 February 2006)
  Grand Cross of the Order of Merit of the Congo of the Republic of Congo (22 February 2006)
  Grand Cross of the Order of the National Hero of the Democratic Republic of the Congo of Congo-Kinshasa (28 February 2006)
  Commander Grand Cross with Chain of the Order of the Three Stars of Latvia (14 May 2007)
  Collar of the Order of Abdulaziz Al Saud of Saudi Arabia (18 May 2007)
  Grand Collar of the Order of Independence of Equatorial Guinea (17 April 2009)
  Grand Cross of the National Order of the Lion (2013)
  Grand Cross of the National Order of Merit of Guinea (4 March 2014)
  Collar of the Order of the Republic of Tunisia (31 May 2014)
  Grand Cross of the National Order of the Ivory Coast (1 June 2015)
  Collar of the Order of Zayed (4 May 2015)
 Grand Cordon of the Order of the Republic of Serbia (2016)
  Grand Cross of the National Order of Madagascar (21 November 2016)
  Grand Collar of the Military Order of Saint James of the Sword of Portugal (28 June 2016)
  Companion of the Order of the Star of Ghana (17 February 2017)
  Grand Cross of the Order of La Pléiade (24 May 2017)
  Ellis Island Medal of Honor of the United States (14 May 2019)
  Chief Commander of the Legion of Merit of the United States (16 January 2021)

Honorary prizes:
 On 22 June 2000, Mohammed received an honorary doctorate from George Washington University.
 On 19 May 2022, Mohammed was awarded the Esquipulas Peace Prize by the Forum of Legislative Presidents of Central America and the Caribbean Basin (FOPREL).
 On 14 May 2023, Mohammed was awarded the President’s Outstanding Achievement Award by CAF.

Ancestry

References

External links 

 Morocco Alaoui dynasty
 King Mohammed VI Grants Exclusive First-ever Interview to Time
 Laurenson, John. The most powerful man in Morocco. BBC News. 11 March 2006.
 Constitutional Reform in Morocco: I Am the Reform!

 
1963 births
Living people
Moroccan Muslims
Muslim monarchs
20th-century monarchs in Africa
21st-century monarchs in Africa
'Alawi dynasty
Mohammed V University alumni
Alumni of the Collège Royal (Rabat)
Kings of Morocco
20th-century Arabs
21st-century Arabs
Moroccan people of Arab descent
Moroccan royalty
Moroccan politicians
Moroccan businesspeople
Moroccan bankers
Moroccan Army officers
Moroccan billionaires
People from Rabat

Collars of the Order of Isabella the Catholic
Grand Cordons of the Order of Valour
Grand Crosses of the Order of Aviz
Extraordinary Grades of the Order of Merit (Lebanon)
Grand Croix of the Légion d'honneur
Grand Crosses of the National Order of Mali
Grand Crosses of the Order of the Liberator General San Martin
Honorary Knights Grand Cross of the Royal Victorian Order
Knights Grand Cross with Collar of the Order of Merit of the Italian Republic
Collars of the Order of Civil Merit
Grand Collars of the Order of Saint James of the Sword